Minx is an American comedy television series created and written by Ellen Rapoport and starring Ophelia Lovibond and Jake Johnson. It premiered on HBO Max on March 17, 2022. In May 2022, the series was renewed for a second season. However, in December 2022, the series was canceled by HBO Max while its second season was in production. The following month, the series was picked up by Starz.

Premise
In the 1970s, a young feminist from Los Angeles joins forces with a low-rent publisher to create the first women's erotic magazine. Through this unlikely alliance the characters discover meaningful relationships in the most odd places.

Cast and characters

Main
 Ophelia Lovibond as Joyce Prigger
 Michael Angarano as Glenn
 Jessica Lowe as Bambi
 Oscar Montoya as Richie
 Lennon Parham as Shelly
 Idara Victor as Tina
 Jake Johnson as Doug Renetti

Guest
 Taylor Zakhar Perez as Shane Brody
 Stephen Tobolowsky as Conrad Ross
 Amy Landecker as Bridget Westbury
 Olivia Rose Keegan as Amber
 Jacqi Vene as Marian
 Austin Nichols as Billy Brunson
 Lesli Margherita as Francesca
 Al Sapienza as Vince
 Tyrone Evans Clark as a Tony Pony Diner Pedestrian
 Alicia Hannah-Kim as Wendy Mah
 Eric Edelstein as Willy
 Samm Levine as Franco
 Rich Sommer as Lenny
 Hope Davis as Victoria Hartnett
 Josh Stamberg as George
 Gillian Jacobs as Maggie
 Susan Walters as Elayne
 Allison Tolman as Wanda
 David Paymer as Myron

Episodes

Production

Development
On February 19, 2020, it was announced that HBO Max had given the project a pilot order. Ellen Rapoport was attached to write as well as executive produce alongside Paul Feig and Dan Magnante of Feigco Entertainment. On September 3, 2020, Unpregnant director Rachel Lee Goldenberg was attached to direct and executive produce the pilot. On April 5, 2021, it was announced that HBO Max had given the project a series pickup for ten half-hour episodes. On May 5, 2022, HBO Max renewed the series for a second season. However, on December 12, 2022, HBO Max canceled the series. At the time, production on the second season was near completion, and Lionsgate sought to give the show a new home. Despite the cancelation, filming for the second season continued to be conducted, with Lovibond later announcing that it had wrapped on December 18, 2022. On January 12, 2023, it was announced that the series had been rescued by Starz.

Casting
On September 16, 2020, Ophelia Lovibond was cast in the lead role. On December 8, 2020, Idara Victor, Oscar Montoya, Jessica Lowe, Lennon Parham, and Michael Angarano joined the main cast, with Jake Johnson cast in a guest role before being promoted to the main cast.

Taylor Zakhar Perez was cast as firefighter Shane. About the challenges he faced while playing the character, he said, "The biggest thing was grounding him, making him likable, and also playing against the line."

Filming
The pilot began filming on December 6, 2020, in Los Angeles.

Reception

Critical response 
The review aggregator website Rotten Tomatoes reported a "Certified Fresh" 97% approval rating with an average rating of 7.8/10, based on 30 critic reviews. The website's critics consensus reads, "The rapport between Ophelia Lovibond and Jake Johnson is the irresistible centerfold of Minx, a bawdy and sharp comedy that merits a full-page spread." Metacritic, which uses a weighted average, assigned a score of 77 out of 100 based on 19 critics, indicating "generally favorable reviews".

Accolades

References

External links
 (archived)
 

2020s American workplace comedy television series
2022 American television series debuts
American television series revived after cancellation
English-language television shows
HBO Max original programming
Television series by Lionsgate Television
Television series set in the 1970s
Television shows set in Los Angeles
Television shows filmed in Los Angeles
Works about magazine publishing